In Denial of Murder is a two-part British television crime drama series, written by Neil McKay and directed by David Richards, that first broadcast on BBC One on 29 February 2004. The series follows investigative journalist Don Hale (Stephen Tompkinson) as he attempts to prove that convicted murderer Stephen Downing (Jason Watkins) was wrongly convicted for the murder of Wendy Sewell (Caroline Catz) in 1973.

The series was based upon Hale's book Town Without Pity (which was later reprinted under the title In Denial of Murder in 2014). Hale sold television rights to the book to Hat Trick productions in November 2000. The series marked the second time that Tompkinson and Catz co-starred together, having previously appeared in All Quiet on the Preston Front and later going on to star together in DCI Banks. Notably, the series has yet to be released on DVD.

Criticism
Don Hale himself criticised the production, stating that "It is NOT a factual documentary and has been especially written for prime-time television. In my opinion, several crucial elements of the story have been omitted and I believe it fails to provide a wholly accurate version of events. The timeline has unfortunately been seriously amended without reason. These errors and others clearly present a false impression."

Following the series broadcast, Stephen Downing commented to the Daily Express, “I don’t know about no pity but it’s a town divided. Some people still think I did it. It is just something I have to live with. In many ways life was easier inside – you did not have to look for a job, you got money, three meals a day and a roof over your head. Since I left prison things have been hard. I don’t really have much of a life. Yes, I’m free but I am still paying for a crime I did not commit.”

Cast
 Stephen Tompkinson as Don Hale
 Caroline Catz as Wendy Sewell
 Jason Watkins as Stephen Downing
 Steve Jackson	as John Marshall
 David Troughton as Ray Downing
 June Watson as Nita Downing
 Lisa Millett as Christine Downing
 Judy Flynn as Kath Hale
 Wayne Foskett as David Sewell
 Jennifer Hennessy as Jackie Dunn 
 Neil Boorman as Ron Duggins
 Malcolm Raeburn as Adrian Duggins
 Andrea Mason as Lesley Shooter
 Ewan Hooper as Charles Hale
 Jeanne Hepple	as Doreen Hale
 Bill Rodgers as Reg Ollerenshaw
 Richard Standing as Roy Eyre
 Ruth Mitchell	as Christine Smith
 Bobby Knutt as Ernie Charlesworth
 Brian Southwood as Eric Clough
 Ryan Sampson as Marcus Edwards

Episodes

References

External links

2004 British television series debuts
2004 British television series endings
2000s British drama television series
BBC television dramas
2000s British television miniseries
English-language television shows